Mikhail Krichman (Михаил Владимирович Кричман; born 1967) is a Russian cinematographer who received a Golden Osella award at the 67th Venice Film Festival for Silent Souls and 3 time award winner at Camerimage. Krichman is best known to western audiences for his work with renowned Russian director Andrey Zvyagintsev. He photographed all of Zvyagintsev's films, including The Return (2003), The Banishment (2007), Elena (2010), Leviathan (2014) and Loveless (2017). Zvyagintsev claims that Krichman (an engineer by profession) learned his craft by reading American Cinematographer. Krichman also shot Miss Julie for Norwegian director Liv Ullmann.

Style
Krichman's cinematography is instrumental in creating the mood that is so imperative to Zvyagintsev's distinctively harrowing journeys of the soul. Predominantly shooting with a crisp, wide lens, Krichman's work often juxtaposes the embittered faces of characters against the weather-worn yet picturesque Russian landscape. There's a coldness to his work, yet it exudes an existential aura that feels like a nightmare slowly unravelling before your eyes. Preferring to film in 35mm and manipulating natural light rather than relying on artificial light sources, Krichman lights space before characters, grounding them within their surroundings and adding an air of realism and immediacy to the events that unfurl.

Early life 
His parents come from the field of book typesetting. After finishing his army service he did not know what to do with himself, and he chose the easiest path. He spent a lot of time in printing houses, and  liked the smell of the paint. Those were the things from his childhood that made him start his studies at what is now Moscow State University of Printing Arts.

It was around 1991. He joined the department of technical studies, learning about the technology and the process of book printing. After third semester he moved to an extramural study program and started doing part-time jobs. And it so happened that he met a guy that was about to graduate from the cinematography department of the Gerasimov Institute of Cinematography. It was a birthday party, and he asked a question that probably a lot of people ask in a similar situation – would it be possible to visit a set and see how things work when they shoot a movie. Then after a year he got in touch, saying that he had an opportunity for Krichman to come and visit a set. That was how Krichman saw a film set for the first time – as he was directing and shooting some kind of a commercial.

Filmography 
 Blowers (TV Series) (1 episode) 
  Loveless (2017)
 The Trio (Short) (2016)
 The Secret Scripture  (2016)
 Podarok Very (Short)  (2016)
  Miss Julie  (2014)
 Leviathan  (2014)
 Winter Journey (2013) 
  Silent Souls (2010)
 Apocrypha (Short) (2009)
 The Banishment  (2010)
 Poor Relatives (2005)
 The Return (2003)
  Sky. Plane. Girl  (2002) 
 Chyornaya komnata (TV Series) (2 episodes) (2000)

Awards and nominations

References

External links
 
 http://www.mikhailkrichman.ru/

1967 births
Living people
European Film Award for Best Cinematographer winners
Russian cinematographers